Dhrriti Saharan is an actress and a singer. She was born in Kolkata and brought up in Mumbai. An Engineer by qualification, she chose to pursue a career in the Indian film industry.

Career
Saharan made her debut in the Punjabi movie Pure Punjabi for which she was nominated for the Best Debut Actress Category at the PTC Punjabi Film Awards in 2013, losing out to Monica Bedi. She also appeared in the video for the hit song "Billo Thumka" from the film Pinky Moge Wali. Sadda Haq is her second film, for which she won the Critics Choice Award for Best Actress at the 2014 PTC Punjabi Film Awards. Teri Meri Ek Jindari, directed by Partho Ghosh.

Filmography

References

Indian film actresses
Actresses from Kolkata
Living people
Year of birth missing (living people)
Actresses in Punjabi cinema
21st-century Indian actresses